Two Lines Up Excentric Variation VI is a 1977 stainless steel sculpture by George Rickey, installed outside the Columbus Museum of Art in Columbus, Ohio, United States. The abstract, kinetic sculpture was donated by the family of the Albert Fullerton Miller.

See also

 1977 in art

References

1977 sculptures
Abstract sculptures in the United States
Columbus Museum of Art
Downtown Columbus, Ohio
Kinetic sculptures in the United States
Outdoor sculptures in Columbus, Ohio
Stainless steel sculptures in the United States
Steel sculptures in Ohio